Wuyang is a town of Zhang County, Gansu, China. It is also the county seat of Zhang County, and is located along the Zhang River. It was established in 1949 as Chengguan town. In 2003 it was merged with Mulin township (木林乡) and renamed to Wuyang. This name originates from the Tang dynasty name of Zhang County.

In 2014 the population of Wuyang was 27,739, including 16,847 rural residents.

Administrative divisions 
Wuyang has jurisdiction over 12 villages and 2 residential communities.

Villages

 Chengguan (城关)
 Dongjiazhuang (董家庄)
 Xinzhuangmen (新庄门)
 Kezhai (柯寨)
 Kongjiaxia (孙家峡)
 Wangjiahe (王家河)
 Linjiawan (蔺家湾)
 Wangjiahe (汪家河)
 Pangjiawan (庞家湾)
 Hejiashan (何家山)
 Hujiawa (胡家屲)
 Baojiashan (包家山)

Residential communities

 Chengdong (城东)
 Chengxi (城西)

References 

Township-level divisions of Gansu
Dingxi